Tatu City is a  special economic zone (SEZ) located  North of Nairobi Central Business District (CBD) in the Ruiru Municipality area  of Kiambu County. It sits within the greater Nairobi Metropolitan region and is a flagship project of the Kenya Vision 2030 blueprint.

Administration
Tatu City is designated as a project of special importance by the Government of Kenya through The Physical Land Use Planning (Classification of Strategic and Inter-county Projects) Regulations of 2019 via the Kenya Gazette Vol.CXXI-No.73 (2019). According to the Kenyan law, projects located within a Special Economic Zone context benefit from government-issued tax incentives among other benefits.

Project Progress

As of 2022 the Tatu City Zone was home to more than 60 business entities two international schools namely Nova Pioneer and Crawford International. The city was (as of 2022) also home to various completed, ongoing, and proposed housing projects among them Kijani Ridge, Lifestyle Heights, Unity Homes, Karibu Homes, Tatu Waters, and Mchana Estates. 

Some of the companies with a presence in the Tatu City Industrial Park by 2022 included Dormans, Kenya Wine (KWAL), Uniliver, Copia, Bidco, Davis & Shirtliff, Coopers, Chandaria Industries, Gallagher, Tianlong, and Kim-Fay among others.

History
The land on which Tatu City sits was originally part of the Belgian Socfinaf coffee farm previously known as Tatu Estate before being acquired by Rendeavour in 2010. This is the same case with Northlands City and Kahawa Sukari tracts of land also in Ruiru which were originally owned by Socfinaf prior to being sold to new owners in the post-colonial era.

Location
Tatu City can be accessed via Thika Road, Nairobi Eastern Bypass Highway, Nairobi Northern Bypass Highway, and the Kamiti Road. It is 30 minutes away from the Nairobi CBD, 40 minutes from the Jomo Kenyatta International Airport, 10 minutes from the Kasarani International Stadium, 5 Minutes from Kamiti Prisons.
The city is in close proximity to the Kenya Prisons Staff Training College (PSTC), Kenyatta University Teaching, Referral & Research Hospital (KUTRRH), Kamiti Maximum Security Prisons. It touches the Nairobi County boundary at its southerly-most tip at Kamiti River.

Environment and parks
Tatu City is located within the relatively green side of Nairobi which is part of the greater Aberdare Ecosystem. Thirty percent of the land is allocated to green spaces among them nature parks, forests, coffee farms (to preserve the heritage of the place), and public amenities.

Controversy
The project was in the middle of a long court battle due to shareholder wars in the period between 2013 and 2018. The matter was a major part of public discourse in the country and even attracted the attention of the Lands Committee of the National Assembly of Kenya which then absolved Tatu City of any wrongdoing.

See also
Konza Technopolis
Silicon Savannah
Kigali Innovation City

References 

Smart cities
Proposed populated places
Sustainable urban planning
Special economic zones
Neo-futurism architecture
Planned cities
Economy of Kenya
Kiambu County
Nairobi